The Chinese Buddhist canon refers to a specific collection of Chinese language Buddhist literature that is deemed canonical in Chinese, Japanese, Korean and Vietnamese Buddhism. The traditional term for the canon is "Great Storage of Scriptures".

The collection

Contents
The Chinese Buddhist canon includes Āgama, Vinaya and Abhidharma texts from Early Buddhist schools, as well as the Mahāyāna sūtras and scriptures from Esoteric Buddhism. The Taishō Daizōkyō is the standard modern edition as systematized by Japanese scholars, published in Japan from 1924 to 1929. The Taisho has fifty-five volumes and 2,184 texts, in the following categories: 

 Āgamas (equivalent to the Pali Nikāyas) and the Jātakas (219 texts in four vols.).
 Mahāyāna Sūtras, grouped into the following sections: Prajñaparamita, Lotus Sūtra, the Avatamsaka, the Ratnakūta, the Mahāparinirvāna, the Mahā-sannipāta and general ‘Sūtras’ (mostly Mahāyāna) (627 texts in thirteen vols.).
 Buddhist Tantras (572 texts in four vols.).
 Vinayas and some texts outlining Bodhisattvas ethics (eighty-six texts in three vols.).
 Commentaries on the Āgamas and Mahāyāna Sūtras (thirty-one texts in three vols.).
 Abhidharma texts (twenty-eight texts in four vols.).
 Mādhyamika, Yogācāra and other Śāstras (‘Treatises’ (129 texts in three vols.).
 Chinese commentaries (twelve vols.).
 Chinese sectarian writings (five vols.).
 Histories and biographies (95 texts in four vols.).
 Encyclopaedias, dictionaries, non-Buddhist works (Hindu, Manichaean, and Nestorian Christian), and catalogues of various Chinese Canons (sixty-four texts in three vols.).
A supplement to the Taishō Daizōkyō was published in 1934. It contains forty-five volumes with 736 other texts, including Japanese texts, texts recently found at Dunhuang, apocryphal texts composed in China, iconographies and bibliographies.

Versions
There are many versions of the canon in East Asia in different places and time. An early version is the Fangshan Stone Sutras (房山石經) from the 7th century. The first printed version of the Chinese Buddhist canon was the 開寶藏 Kaibao Canon, printed by order of Emperor Taizu of Song in the fourth year of the Kaibao era (971). The blocks used to print the Kaibao Canon were lost in the fall of the Northern Song capital Kaifeng in 1127 and there only about twelve fascicles of copies surviving. However, the Kaibao formed the basis for future printed versions that survive intact.

The earlier Qianlong Tripitaka (乾隆藏) and Jiaxing Tripitaka (嘉興藏) are still completely extant in printed form. The Zhaocheng Jin Tripitaka is the most complete earliest tripitaka to survive to this day.    The  and the Qianlong Tripitaka are the only tripitakas for which we still have the complete set of wood blocks. The Tripiṭaka Koreana or Palman Daejanggyeong was carved between 1236 and 1251, during Korea's Goryeo Dynasty, onto 81,340 wooden printing blocks with no known errors in the 52,382,960 characters. It is stored at the Haeinsa temple, South Korea.

One of the most used version is Taishō Shinshū Daizōkyō (大正新脩大藏經). Named after the Taishō era, a modern standardized edition originally published in Tokyo between 1924 and 1934 in 100 volumes. It is also one of the most completely punctuated tripitaka. The history of the Chinese Buddhist canon, including versions that have not survived, has been studied through the use of catalogs. A well known catalog that is included in the Taishō Shinshū Daizōkyō the Kaiyuan Shijiao Lu 開元釋教錄 (Taisho no. 2154). Other catalogs are included in Volume 55. 

The Jiaxing Tripitaka is a supplement for Ming dynasty and Qing dynasty Buddhist texts not collected, and a Dazangjing Bu Bian (大藏經補編) published in 1986 are supplements of them.

The Chinese Manuscripts in the Tripitaka Sinica (中華大藏經–漢文部份 Zhonghua Dazangjing: Hanwen bufen), a new collection of canonical texts, was published by Zhonghua Book Company in Beijing in 1983-97, with 107 volumes of literature, are photocopies of early versions and include many newly unearthed scriptures from Dunhuang. There are newer Tripitaka Sinica projects.

Languages
Mostly written in Classical Chinese. The Mi Tripitaka (蕃大藏經) is the Tangut canon. Eric Grinstead published a collection of Tangut Buddhist texts under the title The Tangut Tripitaka in 1971 in New Delhi. The Taishō edition contains classical Japanese works. The Dunhuang edition contains some works in old Western Regions languages. The Tripitaka Sinica mentioned above features a Tibetan section.

Non-collected works

A number of apocryphal sutras composed in China are excluded in the earlier canons, such as composed stories the Journey to the West and Chinese folk religion texts, and High King Avalokiteshvara Sutra. Modern religious and scholarly works are also excluded but they are published in other book series.

Translations

Samples

See also 
 Early Buddhist texts
 Pali Canon
 Pali literature
 Sanskrit Buddhist literature
 Gandhāran Buddhist Texts
 Taisho Tripitaka
 Tripitaka Koreana
 Tibetan Buddhist canon
 Zhaocheng Jin Tripitaka
 Taoism
 Confucianism

Notes

Further reading

External links

General
The Chinese Canon (Introduction)
WWW Database of Chinese Buddhist texts (Book index)
  Chinese Buddhist Tripitaka Electronic Text Collection, Taipei Edition
  Taishō Tripiṭaka, SAT
Taishō Tripiṭaka, NTI Buddhist Text Reader With matching English titles and dictionary
East Asian Buddhist Studies:  A Reference Guide
The TELDAP projects as the base of the Integration of Buddhist Archives -- Buddhist Lexicographical Resources and Tripitaka Catalogs as the example
Digital Database of Buddhist Tripitaka Catalogues
 大藏经研究 (Book index)
 佛教《大藏经》34种版本介绍保证网络最全 (Book index)
 電子藏經 Extensive list of online tripitakas
 汉文大藏经刊刻源流表 (Book index)
 汉文大藏经概述  (Book index)
 近三十年新发现的佛教大藏经及其价值 (Description of rediscovered texts of the Canon) (Book index)
 历代印本汉文大藏经简介  (Description of existing versions of the Canon)
 汉文佛教大藏经的整理与研究任重道远 (Description of new versions of the Canon)

Texts
 Machine-readable text-database of the Taishō Tripitaka (zip files of Taishō Tripitaka vol. 1-85)
 CBETA Project (with original text of Taishō Tripitaka vol.1-55, 85; the complete Zokuzokyo/Xuzangjing, and the Jiaxing Tripitaka).
 佛教大藏經 (links to big size pdfs)
 藏经楼--佛教导航
 Tripitaka Koreana  (electronic scans)
Numata Center for Buddhist Translation and Research, Berkeley provides some English translations from the Taishō Tripitaka (prints or free pdf) 
Bibliography of Translations from the Chinese Buddhist Canon into Western Languages accessed 2013-07-16
Alternative Source for CBETA
Buddhist Scriptures in Multiple Languages
Chinese Canon with English Titles and Translations
漢文電子大藏經系列 Chinese Buddhist Canon Series

Non-collected works
 報佛恩網 (A collection of many modern Buddhist works outside the existing canon versions)
 生死书繁简版 (Another collection of modern Buddhist works)
 戒邪淫网  (Another collection of modern Buddhist works)
 佛學研究基本文獻及工具書 (Book list)
 大藏经 (Book list)
 大藏经 (Book list)
 佛教大学 (Book list)
 中文佛學文獻檢索與利用 (Book list)
 工具書‧叢書‧大藏經 (Book list)
 Center for Buddhist Studies 國立臺灣大學佛學研究中心 (Book list)
 佛教研究之近況 (Book list)
 佛書- 佛門網Buddhistdoor - 佛學辭彙- Buddhist Glossary (Book list)
 兩岸佛學研究與佛學教育的回顧與前瞻 (Book list)
 当代台湾的佛学研究 (Book list)
 佛教资料库网站集锦(修订3版) (Book list)
美國佛教會電腦資訊庫功德會「藏經閣」
七葉佛教書舍
Chinese buddhism works
佛缘正见 
弘化社，佛教印经，经书流通，净土
佛教书籍网:佛经在线阅读，佛教手机电子书下载，佛学论坛，佛经印刷
妙音文库

Mahayana sutras
Tripiṭaka